"TKO" is a song recorded by American singer-songwriter Justin Timberlake for his fourth studio album, The 20/20 Experience – 2 of 2 (2013). It was written and produced by Timberlake, Timothy "Timbaland" Mosley and Jerome "J-Roc" Harmon, with additional writing from James Fauntleroy and a sample of Barry White's "Somebody's Gonna off the Man". The song was distributed on September 20, 2013 by RCA Records, as the second single from The 20/20 Experience – 2 of 2. A remix of the track by rappers J. Cole, ASAP Rocky and Pusha T, known as the "Black Friday Remix", was also released. The lyrics use boxing metaphors to explain how somebody being knocked out feels to them when they see their ex out with another guy.

"TKO" entered the top 40 on the US Billboard Hot 100, where it reached number 36. The song was eventually certified Gold by Music Canada. The seven-minute official accompanying music video was released in October 2013, and stars Elvis Presley's granddaughter Riley Keough as Timberlake's love interest.

Production and composition 
"TKO" was written and produced by Justin Timberlake, Timbaland and Jerome "J-Roc" Harmon, with James Fauntleroy also serving as co-writer of the track. The song samples Barry White's "Somebody's Gonna Off the Man". Jerome Harmon performed as keyboardist, while Elliot Ives played the guitar. Justin Timberlake handled production and arrangement of his vocals, which were recorded at Larrabee Studios in North Hollywood. The track was engineered by Chris Godbey, and mixed by Jimmy Douglass, Godbey and Timberlake at Larabee Studios, with assistance from Alejandro Baima, The song contains heavy drums and "scratchy" studio effects, which according to a staff writer of Consequence of Sound, is reminiscent of a "slightly more refined Justified." For Jocelyn Vena of MTV News, "Timberlake wasn't lying when he said that this album would be 'more dangerous' than part 1 of the 20/20 Experience, as evidenced by 'TKO.' The track is a Timberlake/Timbaland joint, with signature bleepy production and dark undertones, a far cry from the album's lead single, upbeat throwback jam 'Take Back the Night'."

Lyrically, "TKO" leans heavy on boxing metaphors, with the title "TKO", short for technical knockout, to describe the feeling of seeing a former lover with some else. The theme continues with lines like "I'm out for the count, yeah girl you knock me out."

Release 
After releasing "Take Back the Night" as the first single from the second part of The 20/20 Experience album, Timberlake faced controversy for its title, due to the "Take Back the Night foundation". After that, on September 19, 2013, the singer teased his fans with an Instagram post, saying, "Should I release a new single today???." Later, he posted another photo, saying, "Get Ready...", attached to a photo of him in the studio recording a song. Five hours later, Timberlake posted a tease of the track with a 15-second snippet. To finish the teasing, the singer posted the single's cover art, saying, "You ready to hear it in full???," also revealing its title: "TKO". On September 20, 2013, the single was released.

A remix of "TKO", subtitled the "Black Friday Remix", premiered on November 29, 2013. It features new rap verses from J. Cole, ASAP Rocky and Pusha T.

Critical reception 

"TKO" received mixed reviews from music critics. In a favorable review of the song for PopCrush, Amy Sciarretto wrote that "TKO" "would have been quite comfortable nestled in the track listing of Justified or FutureSex/LoveSounds," however, Timberlake isn't recycling old music material, but giving it a modernized update. She added that the song is essentially this decade's "Cry Me a River". According to James Shotwell of Under the Gun Review, the song is "not what you would call a conventional single choice," but an infectious Timbaland-built production: "There is something about how the heavy bass and snare blends with JT’s signature voice that taps into the soul of every pop music fan when Timbaland is in the mix that simply cannot be denied." He also expressed his opinion that "TKO" was far superior to Timberlake's previous single, "Take Back the Night".

In a less enthusiastic review, Tom Breihan of Stereogum commented that the song "works as a midtempo club track that doesn't have much of the old-school loverman slickness that Timberlake brought to the last album," referring to The 20/20 Experience, and that "the melody doesn't quite stick the way you’d hope a Timberlake melody would." Sal Cinquemani of Slant Magazine called the track "another underwhelming single" and "a retread of Timberlake's past work with longtime collaborator Timbaland." However, he commented that the second half of the song is slightly more sonically interesting. Annie Zaleski of The A.V. Club wrote the song is "sunk by both its tired boxing clichés and chattering Timbaland beats that break no new ground". Kyle Jackson of Common Sense Media was disappointed, writing that, "JT is notably lacking the swagger that has made him an icon. The lyrics are repetitive and heavily reliant upon weak metaphors and predictable songwriting, and the production is uninteresting at best, monotonous at worst". Pitchforks Ryan Dombal panned Timbaland's vocal contributions, joking that he performed "the role of embarrassing uncle [...] starting the track off with unfortunately appropriate (and gross) baby talk"/

Commercial performance
In its first week of release, the single sold 79,000 downloads in the US, debuting at number 54 on the Billboard Hot 100 chart. On the chart issue date December 14, 2013, the song reached a peak of number 36. The song did better on other Billboard genre charts, such as the Hot R&B/Hip-Hop Songs and Pop Songs chart, where it reached number 9 and 12, respectively. In Canada, the song only managed to reach number 28. Elsewhere, the single didn't manage to even reach the top-forty, peaking at number 58 on the UK Singles Chart, in Switzerland number 68 and France 163.

Music video

A music video for the song, directed by Ryan Reichenfeld, was released on October 29, 2013. Timberlake's love interest in the video is played by Elvis Presley's granddaughter Riley Keough, with the video lasting for 7 minutes. In another scene, Keough delivers a cast-iron skillet to Timberlake's cranium. Through it all, Timberlake keeps his chin up and continues to sing even while being dragged to his death.

The video received positive reception from most critics. Carl Williot of Idolator wrote that Timberlake "dropped another epic visual from 'The 20/20 Experience' with 'TKO,' and while the subject matter couldn’t be further from that of his instant classic 'Mirrors' video, this one is just as sprawling and beautifully shot." Billboard Magazine wrote that the video is "a knock-down, drag-out good time, with the singer getting into a bit of a mess with co-star Riley Keough in a slickly produced and thematic seven-minute clip." Erika Harwood of The Michigan Daily called it "Disturbing and captivating, [...] another well crafted addition to the Timberlake canon." However, Melinda Newman of HitFix didn't like the violence on the video, writing that, "[...] this is a misguided look at domestic violence and there’s really no way you can make it work unless you take a much more obviously cartoon-y look than they do here (they already pull all their punches- the sex is pretty antiseptic, no blood after the skillet hit, he almost seems to be enjoyed being dragged) or you really commit and go all out (and run a link to a domestic violence hotline afterwards)."

Track listings 

Digital download
"TKO" — 7:04

Digital download (Radio Edit)
"TKO" (Radio Edit) — 4:48

Digital download (Black Friday Remix)
"TKO" (Black Friday Remix) (featuring J. Cole, A$AP Rocky and Pusha T) — 4:32

Personnel 
Credits from liner notes of The 20/20 Experience:
Justin Timberlake – lead vocals, vocal producer and arranger, mixer
Timbaland – backing vocals, production
Jerome "J-Roc" Harmon – production
Elliott Ives – guitarist
Jerome Harmon – keyboardist
Chris Godbey – engineer, mixer
Jimmy Douglass – mixer
Alejandro Baima – assistant mixer

Charts

Weekly charts

Monthly charts

Year-end charts

Certifications

|+Certifications and sales for "TKO"

Release history

References 

2013 singles
Justin Timberlake songs
Song recordings produced by Jerome "J-Roc" Harmon
Song recordings produced by Justin Timberlake
Song recordings produced by Timbaland
Songs written by James Fauntleroy
Songs written by Jerome "J-Roc" Harmon
Songs written by Justin Timberlake
Songs written by Timbaland
Songs written by Barry White
2013 songs
RCA Records singles